Vişneli is a village in the Çemişgezek District, Tunceli Province, Turkey. The village is populated by Kurds of the Şikakî and had a population of 118 in 2021.

The hamlet of Karşıtepe is attached to the village.

References 

Kurdish settlements in Tunceli Province
Villages in Çemişgezek District